Scopula erinaria is a moth of the family Geometridae. It was described by Charles Swinhoe in 1904. It is found in Ethiopia, Kenya, Malawi, South Africa, Tanzania and Zimbabwe.

Subspecies
Scopula erinaria erinaria (Kenya, Malawi, Tanzania)
Scopula erinaria isolata L. B. Prout, 1920 (South Africa)

References

Moths described in 1904
Moths of Africa
erinaria
Taxa named by Charles Swinhoe